Wonder Mom was a Philippine informative show which aired every Saturday morning on ABS-CBN. It was intended to help mothers be productive and self-reliant to their families. It aired from July 5, 2008 to October 24, 2009, and was replaced by Kulilits.

Host
Karen Davila

See also
 List of programs broadcast by ABS-CBN

References

Philippine television shows
ABS-CBN original programming
2008 Philippine television series debuts
2009 Philippine television series endings
Filipino-language television shows